Balmoral Hotel is a Canadian short drama film, directed by Wayne Wapeemukwa and released in 2015. The film stars Angel Gates as a First Nations sex worker who dances along Hastings Street in Vancouver's Downtown Eastside, in a performance that gradually morphs into a political statement against colonization.

The film was named to the Toronto International Film Festival's year-end Canada's Top Ten list for short films in 2015. It subsequently received two Leo Award nominations in 2016, for Best Short Drama and Best Performance by a Female in a Short Drama.

References

External links

2015 films
2015 short films
Canadian dance films
Films directed by Wayne Wapeemukwa
Films shot in Vancouver
Films set in Vancouver
Canadian drama short films
2010s Canadian films